Adeuomphalus densicostatus is a species of sea snail, a marine gastropod mollusc, unassigned to family in the superfamily Seguenzioidea.

References

External links
 To Encyclopedia of Life
 To World Register of Marine Species

densicostatus
Gastropods described in 1884